Louis Mesenkop (February 6, 1903 – February 19, 1974) was an American sound engineer. He won two Academy Awards for Best Special Effects and was nominated for another in the same category. Mesenkop was part of the production team who received an Academy Honorary Award at the 11th Academy Awards for their efforts on the Paramount film Spawn of the North.

Selected filmography
Mesenkop won two Academy Awards for Best Special Effects and was nominated for another:

Won
 I Wanted Wings (1941)
 Reap the Wild Wind (1942)

Nominated
 Aloma of the South Seas (1941)

References

External links

1903 births
1953 deaths
American audio engineers
Academy Honorary Award recipients
Best Visual Effects Academy Award winners
People from Illinois
20th-century American engineers